Valentia Thokozile Malinga (born 19 December 1974) is a South African politician and a Member of the National Assembly of South Africa from Mpumalanga. She is a member of the African National Congress.

Background
Malinga has a matric certificate. She studied for a Bachelor of Arts in Education, but could not complete the degree. She is a former member of the mayoral committee in the Lekwa Local Municipality in Mpumalanga and a current member of the provincial executive committee of the African National Congress (ANC). She had previously been the branch secretary of the ANC's Johnny Mokoena branch, a sub-region convenor of the African National Congress Youth League, and a regional executive committee member and a regional working committee member of the ANC's Gert Sibande region in Mpumalanga.

In 2014, she stood for election to the Mpumalanga Provincial Legislature as 26th on the ANC's list. She was not elected. Malinga then worked as an administrator at the ANC's Lekwa constituency office until 2016.

Parliamentary career
In 2019 Malinga stood for election to the South African National Assembly as 7th on the ANC's list of National Assembly candidates from Mpumalanga. She was elected to the National Assembly in the election.

Malinga currently serves as a member of the Portfolio Committee on Mineral Resources and Energy and as an alternate member of the  Portfolio Committee on Public Enterprises.

References

External links

Living people
1974 births
African National Congress politicians
Members of the National Assembly of South Africa
Women members of the National Assembly of South Africa